Marshall University in Huntington, West Virginia is home to many notable structures, including two residential high-rises.

Main campus buildings

Medical and Forensic Science Facilities
The Medical Campus consists of several buildings in or near the Fairfield neighborhood of Huntington, in Huntington's east end neighborhood; and at the VA Medical Facility.

Forensic Science Center, which is the remodeled 1971 football locker room complex from the otherwise demolished Fairfield Stadium, completed in 2004.
Erma Byrd Clinics, a part of the medical school, completed in 2006. Both are located at 1401 Forensic Science Drive.
The School of Pharmacy is housed in Kopp Hall, which is located at the corner of Charleston Avenue and Hal Greer Blvd.  It was completed in 2019.  It also contains a housing unit for married students.
Coon Medical Education Building is located seven miles from the main campus at 1540 Spring Valley Drive in the unincorporated suburb of Spring Valley, on the grounds of the United States Department of Veterans Affairs Hospital at Huntington.  It was completed in 1976 and remodeled in 2011, at one time it housed the complete School of Medicine.  Today it continues to house the anatomy labs and research facilities.
Medical Center, completed in 2001, is located at 1340 Hal Greer Boulevard on the campus of Cabell Huntington Hospital is part of the Health Sciences Campus as well as the School of Medicine.
 School of Physical Therapy is located at the St. Mary's Medical Education Center on the campus of St. Mary's Medical Center at 3101 5th Avenue.

Other Huntington Locations

University Heights
An area on the outskirts of town was used as the West Virginia Colored Children's Home (by that time it was actually being used as a sanitarium for elderly black men) and the surrounding farm land (in that era state institutions grew much of their own food) was transferred to the University at the end of segregation as "University Heights", with the intention of developing a second campus.  The building was converted into housing for married students, along with a few new apartment buildings, but the property was never developed fully, being used for storage, a baseball field (which was not adequate for the team's needs and eventually abandoned), and much of the property was transferred to other state agencies over the years.  In 2011 the buildings were demolished and the remaining property was transferred to the Cabell County Board of Education for a new middle school.

Marshall University – South Charleston Campus
Located in South Charleston, West Virginia at One Angus E. Peyton Drive.

Graduate College Administration Building, completed 1990.

Byrd Academic and Technology Center, completed 1995.

Byrd Institute
The Robert C. Byrd Institute, a non-academic technology transfer division of the University maintains:

RCBI Huntington at 1050 4th Avenue, a former bank building donated to the University.

RCBI South Charleston, on the South Charleston Campus.

RCBI Rocket Center, at 410 State Route 956, on the grounds of the United States Navy Allegheny Ballistics Laboratory.

RCBI Bridgeport, at 2400 East Bennedum Industrial Drive, a NASA facility.

Statewide Extension
The school also has the following off-campus instruction sites.  The owned Mid-Ohio Valley Center at One John Marshall Way in Point Pleasant, the leased Teays Valley Center at One Carriage Point in Hurricane, and on the campus of the  Southern West Virginia Community and Technical College in Logan and Williamson.  The University also has an ownership interest in the Erma Byrd Higher Education Center in suburban Beckley, along with Concord University and Bluefield State College.

The Marshall University Rural Health Clinic, a part of the medical school, is located on Airport Road in Chapmanville, West Virginia.

In 2017, the medical school acquired the former Patriot Coal office building in Scott Depot and converted into the clinical offices as Marshall Health-Teays Valley.  It is located at 300 Corporate Center Drive.

References

See also 
 Cityscape of Huntington, West Virginia
 Marshall University

Buildings and structures in Huntington, West Virginia
Marshall University
Marshall University
Marshall University